The Castle of Argol is a 1938 novel by the French writer Julien Gracq. The narrative is set at a castle in Brittany, where a man has invited a friend, who also has brought a young woman. The novel is loaded with symbols and uses narrative modes from Gothic horror literature, which it blends with Hegelian thinking and stylistic traits close to the surrealist movement, including a highly abstract plot. In his "Notice to the reader", Gracq describes the book as a "demonic version" of Richard Wagner's opera Parsifal.

Publication
The novel, which was the author's first, was rejected by éditions Gallimard but accepted and published by José Corti, which was associated with the surrealists. It was praised by the surrealist leader André Breton. An English translation by Louise Varèse was published in 1951.

References

1938 French novels
French-language novels
Novels by Julien Gracq
Novels set in Brittany
1938 debut novels